E. indicus may refer to:
 Eiconaxius indicus, a mud lobster species
 Elephas maximus indicus, the Indian elephant, a subspecies of the Asian elephant
 Enarthromyces indicus, a fungus species

See also
 Indicus (disambiguation)